Holly Adrienne Hogrobrooks (September 8, 1940 – January 22, 2016) was an American civil rights activist and journalist in Houston, Texas. She was a leader of the Progressive Youth Association, active in student protests against racial segregation in 1960 and 1961.

Early life 

Holly Hogrobrooks was born in Houston, the daughter of Theodore Marcus Hogrobrooks and Euneida Mae Goens Hogrobrooks. She attended the Mather School in South Carolina. As a student at Texas Southern University, she was a founding member of the Progressive Youth Association, and its successor, the Sit-In Foundation.

Career 
In 1960, while she was a college student, Hogrobrooks organized the first sit-in protest against racial segregation at a Houston lunch counter, and worked with Freedom Riders in 1961, to desegregate train stations. She was jailed at least twice for her civil rights activism. She was later a journalist at the Houston Informer and the Houston Forward Times, worked in public relations, and taught at her alma mater, Texas Southern University, until she retired in 2000.

Personal life 
Hogrobrooks married Joseph D. Brown in 1969. They divorced in 1979. She was survived by a daughter when she died in 2016, aged 75 years, in Memphis, Tennessee.

References

External links 

 A video clip from a 1988 interview with Holly Hogrobrooks and Otis King, about the 1960 sit-in protest in Houston, from the This Is Our Home, It Is Not For Sale Film Collection, University of Houston Libraries.
 Transcript of a 1994 oral history interview with Holly Hogrobrooks and Gladys House, conducted by the Institute of Texan Cultures, from the UTSA Libraries Digital Collections.
A 2008 public affairs program on public access television, featuring Holly Hogrobrooks, Hamilton Lewis, and Ed Shannon; from Internet Archive.

1940 births
2016 deaths
People from Houston
American civil rights activists
Women civil rights activists
Texas Southern University alumni
Texas Southern University faculty
American women journalists
American women academics
21st-century American women